Guangzhou International Finance Center or Guangzhou West Tower, is a 103-story, skyscraper at Zhujiang Avenue West in the Tianhe District of Guangzhou, Guangdong. One half of the Guangzhou Twin Towers, it is the 24th tallest building in the world, completed in 2010. As of March 2018, it is the world's tallest building with a roof-top helipad, at (499 m high).

Construction of the building, designed by WilkinsonEyre, broke ground in December 2005, and was completed in 2010. The building is used as a conference center, hotel and office building. Floors 1 through 66 are used as offices, floors 67 and 68 are for mechanical equipment, floors 69 to 98 have a Four Seasons Hotel with the lobby being on the 70th floor, and floors 99 and 100 are used as an observation deck.

The building was the winner of the RIBA 2012 Lubetkin Prize.

See also

Diagrid
List of tallest buildings in Guangzhou
List of buildings with 100 floors or more

References

External links
 
 Four Seasons Guangzhou official website
 

Skyscraper office buildings in Guangzhou
Tianhe District
Office buildings completed in 2010
Hotel buildings completed in 2010
Skyscraper hotels in Guangzhou
Skyscrapers in Guangzhou
2010 establishments in China